Majami'al-Hadb Reserve is a protected area in Saudi Arabia managed by the Saudi Wildlife Authority.

Overview 
The 3400 km² protected area is situated to the north of Najd in central Saudi Arabia. It was listed as a protected area in1993 to preserve plant and animal species in this area.

Wildlife 
Majami'al-Hadb reserve is characterized by a landscape of granite and pyroclastic domes. The animal species inhabiting this reserve are the Arabian wolf, Ruppell's fox, ratel, hare, rock hyrax, caracal, and mongoose.

See also 

 List of protected areas of Saudi Arabia

References 



Protected areas of Saudi Arabia